Georg Gaßmann (28 May 1910 in Marburg – 5 August 1987 in Marburg) was a German politician.

As a member of the SPD, Gaßmann was the mayor of Marburg for nearly 20 years and a member of the Hessian Landtag in Wiesbaden.

After serving as a politician, Gaßmann was awarded the Großes Verdienstkreuz, one of the German Federal Crosses of Merit. The Georg-Gaßmann-Stadion in Marburg was also named in his honour.

References

Further reading 
 

1910 births
1987 deaths
People from Marburg
University of Marburg alumni
Mayors of Marburg
Members of the Landtag of Hesse
Social Democratic Party of Germany politicians
Commanders Crosses of the Order of Merit of the Federal Republic of Germany